The Turuun River is a river of western Mongolia. It flows through the sum of Baruunturuun in Uvs Province.

References 

Uvs Province
Rivers of Mongolia